André Moccand (born 25 January 1931) is a Swiss rower who competed in the 1948 Summer Olympics. In 1948 he was the coxswain of the Swiss boat which won the silver medal in the coxed fours event.

References

External links
 
 
 

1931 births
Possibly living people
Swiss male rowers
Coxswains (rowing)
Olympic rowers of Switzerland
Rowers at the 1948 Summer Olympics
Olympic silver medalists for Switzerland
Olympic medalists in rowing
Medalists at the 1948 Summer Olympics